"What Did I Do?/God as My Witness" is a song by the American rock band Foo Fighters and is the fourth single from their eighth studio album Sonic Highways. The song was released on November 6, 2014.

Recording
The song was recorded at KLRU-TV Studio 6A in Austin, Texas and features a guest appearance from Gary Clark Jr.

Music video
The music video aired during the fourth episode of Foo Fighters: Sonic Highways. It mainly shows Foo Fighters and Gary Clark Jr. performing inside of KLRU-TV Studio 6A, the famous location where Austin City Limits was filmed.

Charts

References

2014 singles
2014 songs
Foo Fighters songs
Song recordings produced by Butch Vig
Songs written by Dave Grohl
Songs written by Taylor Hawkins
Songs written by Nate Mendel
Songs written by Chris Shiflett
Songs written by Pat Smear